Dogtown, California may refer to:

 Dogtown, El Dorado County, California, a former settlement and mining camp
 Dogtown, Marin County, California, an unincorporated community
 Dogtown, Mariposa County, California, an unincorporated community
 Dogtown, Mono County, California, a ghost town
 Dogtown, San Joaquin County, California, a census designated place
 Dogtown, Tulare County, California, a ghost town
 Dogtown, Oakland, California, a neighborhood
 Garberville, California, formerly called Dogtown
 Harris, California, formerly called Dogtown
 Magalia, California, formerly called Dogtown
 Santa Monica, California, nicknamed Dogtown
 William Mead Homes, north of Los Angeles, nicknamed Dogtown

See also 
 Dogtown (disambiguation)
 Dogtown and Z-Boys, a 2001 documentary film 
 Lords of Dogtown, a 2005 American biographical drama film
 Santa Monica neighborhoods#Ocean Park Neighborhood